Wirtz Corporation is an American holding company headquartered in Chicago, Illinois. It was founded in 1926 by Arthur Wirtz as a family-owned corporation to oversee his real estate holdings. The company shortly thereafter expanded into liquor distribution. The company grew significantly throughout the 20th century by purchasing many competing liquor distributors, as well as the Chicago Blackhawks NHL team (becoming full owners in 1966), and the Chicago Bulls NBA team in 1972 (Wirtz Corp. sold the Bulls to Jerry Reinsdorf in 1985). Wirtz Corporation is part owner of the United Center arena, and also owns banking and insurance interests.

After founder Arthur Wirtz's death in 1983, his son, William, took control of the corporation and ran it until his death in 2007. The company's current owner and CEO is Rocky Wirtz.

Subsidiaries
The following is a partial list of subsidiaries of Wirtz Corporation

 Banner Collective
 Benefit Services Group, Inc.
 Chicago Blackhawks
 First National Bank of South Miami
 First Security Trust and Savings Bank
 Ivanhoe Nursery
 United Center (shared with Jerry Reinsdorf)
 Breakthru Beverage Group (formerly known as Judge & Dolph until 2009, then Wirtz Beverage Group until the 2016 merger with Charmer Sunbelt)
 Wirtz Insurance Agency
 Wirtz Realty

References

Companies based in Chicago
Holding companies established in 1922
American companies established in 1922
Holding companies of the United States